Michael Fung-A-Wing (born 18 December 1978) is a Surinamese former swimmer who specialized in backstroke events.  A two-time Olympian (1996 and 2000), he holds Surinamese records in a backstroke double (both 100-metre and 200-metre), still standing for more than a decade.  While studying at the University of Georgia in the United States, Fung-A-Wing swam for the Georgia Bulldogs swimming and diving team under head coach Jack Bauerle.

Fung-A-Wing's Olympic debut came at seventeen years old for Suriname at the 1996 Summer Olympics in Atlanta.  There, he failed to reach the top 16 final in the 100 m backstroke, finishing forty-seventh in a time of 1:01.24.

At the 2000 Summer Olympics in Sydney, Fung-A-Wing competed again in the 100 m backstroke. He set a Surinamese record and a FINA B-cut of 58.31 from the Texas Senior Circuit Championships in College Station, Texas. He challenged seven other swimmers in heat two, including South Korea's 17-year-old Sung Min. Fung-A-Wing picked up a sixth seed on the final lap in 59.06, finishing outside his entry standard, and a 1.71-second deficit from leader Sung. Fung-A-Wing failed to advance into the semifinals, as he placed forty-eighth overall in the prelims.

Since his sporting career ended in the early 2000s, Fung-A-Wing currently works for Toshiba Business Solutions, and as a chairman club's member for Gwinnett Chamber of Commerce.

References

External links

1978 births
Living people
Surinamese male swimmers
Olympic swimmers of Suriname
Swimmers at the 1996 Summer Olympics
Swimmers at the 1999 Pan American Games
Swimmers at the 2000 Summer Olympics
Pan American Games competitors for Suriname
Male backstroke swimmers
Sportspeople from Paramaribo
Georgia Bulldogs men's swimmers